The  Dictionary of Australian Artists (DAA) was the outcome of a project begun in the 1970s at the University of Sydney under the leadership of Bernard Smith, and was continued after his retirement in 1981 by Joan Kerr. The dictionary went online as the digitised version of the DAA, known as the Dictionary of Australian Artists Online (DAAO), in the early 2000s, before being revised and extended as Design & Art Australia Online in 2010.

Background
The project to create the Dictionary of Australian Artists began in the 1970s at the University of Sydney under the leadership of Bernard Smith and funded by the Australian Research Council. Its development was continued after his retirement in 1981 by Joan Kerr (1938–2004), who brought a new standard of inclusivity to a work that had concentrated on mainstream figures.

In early 2003 Kerr found that it was not possible to publish her recent research on Australian Black and White artists. In addition the 1991 edition of the Dictionary was out of print, and being marketed as a rare book, but Oxford University Press were not interested in a new edition. In both cases  publishers indicated that the small size of the Australian book market meant that scholarly publications of this nature were no longer a viable financial proposition. Kerr discussed her problem with Joanna Mendelssohn when she was giving a guest lecture to Mendelssohn's Australian art history students at the College of Fine Arts (COFA). Mendelssohn's writing students had begun to publish their work online in a (now defunct) blog entitled Artwrite and she was only too aware of the lack of reliable scholarly material on Australian art on the web. She suggested to Kerr that the solution was to take her research online. Mendelssohn enlisted the support of University of New South Wales (UNSW) librarian Andrew Wells and Neil Brown, the COFA Associate Dean of Research.

When Kerr was diagnosed with terminal cancer, the project became a national effort by scholars in Australian art to ensure that Kerr's legacy would be in part a continuance of her scholarly research. Kerr asked for Vivien Johnson, author of scholarly works on Western Desert artists, to become editor in chief of the project. Before she died on 22 February 2004, she knew that a national partnership of universities, art galleries, and libraries was in the process of applying for funding to create the Dictionary of Australian Artists Online (DAAO). The first Australian Research Council (ARC) grant in support of the project was a partnership headed by UNSW, the Art Gallery of New South Wales, The National Gallery of Australia, the National Library of Australia, the State Library of New South Wales, the University of Sydney, and Charles Darwin University.

Online
Initially, three major books were digitised: the two works by Joan Kerr and one by Vivien Johnson listed below, plus a database of cartoonists prepared previously by Kerr and of prints by Roger Butler of the National Gallery of Australia.  Johnson, with the assistance of Tess Allas and Laura Fisher, also added an extensive database of Aboriginal biographies created as a part of her Storylines project. The first project director was  Leonie Hellmers (2005 to 2008).

In 2010, after a third ARC grant, the DAAO began the process of revising its website and transforming itself into Design & Art Australia Online.

Description
The current research director is Gillian Fuller, supported by managing editor Olivia Bolton and data manager Jo Croucher. Joanna Mendelssohn and Anita Calloway are joint editors in chief, and Ross Harley is the new lead chief investigator.

Bibliography
Kerr, Joan Dictionary of Australian Artists, Painters, Sketchers, Photographers and Engravers to 1870 Melbourne 1992 
Kerr, Joan Heritage: The National Women's Art Book Sydney 1995 
Johnson, Vivien Western Desert Artists: A Biographical Dictionary 1995

See also
Other reference works covering Australian art include:
McCulloch, Alan Encyclopedia of Australian Art 1st edition 1968, Hutchinson & Co, London 
McCulloch, Alan Encyclopedia of Australian Art 2nd edition 1984 (Two volumes), Hutchinson & Co, London 
Germaine, Max Artists and Galleries of Australia and New Zealand 1979, Lansdowne Editions, Dee Why West, NSW 2099

References

External links 
 Design and Art Australia Online
 How the internet liberated Australia’s art history at The Conversation

Australian biographical dictionaries